This article provides details of international football games played by the Zimbabwe national football team from 2020 to present.

Results

2020

2021

2022

References

2020
2020s in Zimbabwean sport